Gros Cap Indian Village 49A is a First Nations reserve which is surrounded by Wawa, Ontario, but almost borders Gros Cap 49. It is one of the reserves of the Michipicoten First Nation.

References

External links
 Canada Lands Survey System

Ojibwe reserves in Ontario
Communities in Algoma District